Thandeka  is a Unitarian Universalist minister, an American liberal theologian, and the creator of a contemporary affect theology. 

Thandeka's affect theology grounds religious knowing in human feeling, combining concepts from nineteenth-century theologian Friedrich Schleiermacher with insights from affective neuroscience. Thandeka is the founder and CEO of Love Beyond Belief, a non-profit organization which works to bring about spiritual vitality and renewal in religious organizations and spiritual but not religious organizations through small group “Universal Connections” workshops, consultations, and programs.

Biography 
Thandeka was born Sue Booker to Emma (Barbour) Booker, an artist and teacher, and Merrel D. Booker, a Baptist minister and seminary professor who had studied with Reinhold Niebuhr and Paul Tillich at Union Theological School in New York City. She was drawn to the Unitarian church in the 1960s, and was ordained as a Unitarian Universalist minister in 2001. She received her name from Archbishop Desmond Tutu in 1984; it means "beloved" or "one who is loved by God" in Xhosa.

She studied journalism at the University of Illinois at Urbana-Champaign and Columbia University’s Graduate School of Journalism, and went on to earn an M.A. in history of religions at UCLA. She earned a Ph.D. from Claremont Graduate University in 1988, where she studied with John Cobb and Jack C. Verheyden.

Career 
Thandeka is a former television producer and an Emmy award winner. She has taught at San Francisco State University, Williams College, Meadville Lombard Theological School, Harvard Divinity School, Lancaster Seminary, and Brandeis University.

Theology 
Thandeka's theological work considers the role of feeling or emotion in human religious and spiritual experiences. Her book The Embodied Self is based on a close reading of Schleiermacher's Dialektik, focusing on his idea that feeling is primary in human experience, and exploring how feeling enables people to connect mind and body, or thinking and organic being. Thandeka has gone on to consider the religious significance of neuroscientific understandings of emotions, especially those of Jaak Panksepp. Thandeka's affect theology centers affective consciousness, as opposed to belief, in religious experience.

White racial identity 
Thandeka also critiques some popular approaches to anti-racism work, and takes a different approach to understanding white racial identity. She considers the concepts of racism and white privilege to be terms needing further exploration. She affirms explorations begun by James Baldwin, using insights from neuroscience and complex post-traumatic stress disorders. Thandeka analyzes the psychology of white identities were constructed in America to hide a profound sense of betrayal by one’s own white kith and kin, white community, and white government. This sense of betrayal injures persons’ ability to be “relational beings.” While Thandeka is hopeful that her insights into this will help white Americans discover their common ground with other groups who are suffering so that mutual advance are made, others disagree. In 1999, Thandeka criticized the anti-racism program adopted by the Unitarian Universalist Association for its reliance on ideas of original sin and human helplessness, which are rejected by Unitarian Universalism. Her program for congregational spiritual revitalization includes efforts to address racial and economic injustice through the love, care, and compassion of small group ministries networking together to heal themselves and the world.

Love Beyond Belief 

The application of Thandeka's contemporary affect theology is operational in her non-profit organization, Love Beyond Belief. LBB takes a two-pronged approach of revitalizing both religious and non-religious organizations as well as working with individuals in small group settings to create direct experiences of care, support, and love.

Publications 
Thandeka's book The Embodied Self: Friedrich Schleiermacher's Solution to Kant's Problem of the Empirical Self (1995), undertakes a major re-reading of the philosophical analysis of F. D. E. Schleiermacher's theological claims, namely, his Dialektik. 

In Learning to be White: Money, Race, and God in America (1999), Thandeka reaffirms W.E.B. DuBois's view that American slavery was first and foremost a labor issue. She also affirms the work of social critic W. J. Cash who calls the results of the white exploitation a white pathology in his 1941 book The Mind of the South.  

Her essays have appeared in The Oxford University Handbook on Feminist Theology and Globalization (2011) and The Cambridge Companion to Schleiermacher (2005).

In Love Beyond Belief: Finding the Access Point to Spiritual Awareness (2018), Thandeka tracks how Christian theology lost its original emotional foundation of love through a linguistic error created by the first-century Apostle Paul when he introduced a new word “conscience” [Greek, 'syneidesis'] to discourse on Christ. This discourse became the New Testament emotional foundation for handling gentile pain and suffering that generated almost 2000 years of anti-Jewish and anti-Judaic Christian sentiment and activity, (2) Paul’s error was initially justified, explained and compounded by Augustine and then Martin Luther, (3) Schleiermacher tried but failed to correct the error by reaffirming love as the affective foundation of Christian faith, (4) the nineteenth-century American enlightenment of Common Sense moral values reaffirmed the false foundation for Christian faith of pain and suffering accidentally created by Paul, and (4) liberal Protestants abandoned the errant emotional foundation without retrieving the original emotional foundation for Gentile faithfulness to Christ that Paul tried to establish, (5) the critique of the compromised legacy of Protestantism by Reinhold Niebuhr and John B. Cobb Jr., (6) and the successful reaffirmation by Thandeka of the original Pauline foundation of love for faithfulness to Christ.

Personal life 
Thandeka's partner is Naomi King, the daughter of novelist Stephen King.

References

External links
 
 

1946 births
Living people
African-American religious leaders
American Unitarian Universalists
Claremont Graduate University alumni
Female Unitarian Universalist clergy
African-American theologians
White culture scholars
Members of the Jesus Seminar
African-American television producers
21st-century African-American people
20th-century African-American people